Wheatfield Township is one of thirteen townships in Jasper County, Indiana, United States. As of the 2010 census, its population was 4,395 and it contained 1,658 housing units.

Wheatfield Township was established in 1858.

Geography
The stream of Delehanty Ditch runs through this township.

Cities and towns
 Wheatfield

Unincorporated towns
 Kersey
 Stoutsburg

Adjacent townships
 Pleasant Township, Porter County (northeast)
 Kankakee Township (east)
 Walker Township (southeast)
 Keener Township (west)
 Boone Township, Porter County (northwest)

Major highways
  U.S. Route 231
  Indiana State Road 10
  Indiana State Road 49

Education
Wheatfield Township residents are eligible to obtain a free library card from the Jasper County Public Library.

References
 U.S. Board on Geographic Names (GNIS)
 United States Census Bureau cartographic boundary files

External links

 Indiana Township Association
 United Township Association of Indiana

Townships in Jasper County, Indiana
Townships in Indiana